Richard Hawe (1883 – 1961) was an English footballer who played for Stoke.

Career
Hawe was as born in Stoke-upon-Trent and played amateur football with Goldenhill United before joining Stoke in 1908. He continued to play with Goldenhill United and was used by Stoke as and when they needed him. He spent three seasons with Stoke and made a single appearance in each season.

Career statistics

References

English footballers
Stoke City F.C. players
1883 births
1940 deaths
Association football midfielders